is a Japanese football player.

Playing career
Nakamura was born in Kanagawa Prefecture on May 17, 1993. After graduating from Kokushikan University, he joined J2 League club Thespakusatsu Gunma in 2016. In April, he moved to Regional Leagues club Tonan Maebashi. In 2017, he returned to Thespakusatsu Gunma. In August 2017, he moved to Tonan Maebashi again. In 2018, he returned to Thespakusatsu Gunma. On June 6, he debuted against Vegalta Sendai in Emperor's Cup. In July, he moved to Regional Leagues club Suzuka Unlimited FC.

References

External links

1993 births
Living people
Kokushikan University alumni
Association football people from Kanagawa Prefecture
Japanese footballers
J3 League players
J2 League players
Thespakusatsu Gunma players
Suzuka Point Getters players
Association football defenders